Arun Bhatt (1934–2001) was an Indian film director and producer active in Hindi and Gujarati cinema during the 1970s and 1980s.

Biography 
Arun Bhatt was born on 26 September 1934. He was the eldest son of the movie producer and director Vijay Bhatt, the founder of Prakash Pictures.

Career
Bhatt started his career as an assistant to his father. In the early 1960s he made short films and documentaries as "Vijay Films", a production company started by Bhatt and his brother-in-law Kishore Vyas. He produced several documentary films for the Government of Gujarat.

In 1971, he founded Vijay Films International. His first film was Verno Vaaras, a dramatization of a folk tale in Gujarati, starring Arvind Joshi and Usha Solanki. Later, he made Vardaan in Hindi with Vinod Mehra, Reena Roy and Mehmood. Mehmood received a Filmfare Award for his role as a Gujarati businessman.

In May 1977, the Gujarati film Maa Baap was released, and ran for more than 25 weeks in cinemas, a so-called "Silver Jubilee". Throughout the 1980s, Bhatt produced several Gujarati films, including Mota Ghar Ni Vahu which was also a Silver Jubilee, Lohi Ni Sagaai, Ghar Ghar Ni Vaat, and Hiro Ghoghe Jai Aavyo.

In Hindi, Bhatt directed Ghar Jamai for producer Rajkumar Shahbadi which starred Mithun Chakraborty, Varsha Usgaonkar and Kadar Khan, and Jawani Zindabad for Jay Mehta starring Aamir Khan, Farha and Kadar Khan.

Bhatt worked with music directors, such as Avinash Vyas, and his son Gaurang Vyas to write songs for his films.

Awards
The documentaries Poet Saints of Gujarat and Industries in Gujarat, produced for the Government of Gujarat, won awards as Best Documentary Film 1962-63 and Second best Documentary Film 1962-63 respectively, from the Government of Gujarat. 

Bhatt also won several awards from the Government of Gujarat for Best Director: for Pooja Na Phool, Sona Ni Jaal, Ghar Ghar Ni Vaat, Shetal Tara Oonda Pani and Lakhtar Ni Laadi Ne Vilayat No Var.

His last completed film Lakhtar Ni Laadi won 11 Gujarat State Awards including the Best Screenplay and Second Best Director Award.

Death
Bhatt died on 17 April 2001, leaving his last Gujarati film, Rangaai Jaane Rangma, incomplete.

Family
Bhatt's son, Chirantan Bhatt is a music composer working in Bollywood and in Telugu cinema.

Filmography

References

External links
Official website
 

Article in The Indian Express

Film directors from Gujarat
20th-century Indian film directors
Gujarati-language film directors
Hindi-language film directors
1934 births
2001 deaths